The Minister for Parliamentary Relations (Italian: Ministro per i Rapporti con il Parlamento) in Italy is one of the positions in the Italian government.

The current minister is Luca Ciriani, who held the office since 22 October 2022.

List of Ministers
Parties:

Coalitions

Timeline

References

Parliamentary Relations